Cabaret Neiges Noires is a 1997 French Canadian musical film, by Cine Qua Non Films. It was directed by Raymond Saint-Jean and written by Dominic Champagne. Its tagline is Le cri d'une génération.

Cast

References

 (in French)
 (in French)

1997 films
1997 musical films
Canadian musical films
1990s French-language films
French-language Canadian films
1990s Canadian films